Everton Football Club is an English professional football club based in Liverpool that competes in the Premier League, the top tier of English football. Supporters of the club are known as Evertonians or "Toffees".

Demographics 
Everton has a large fan base by virtue of being an original founder member of The Football League and contesting more seasons in the top flight than any other club. For the first nine seasons in the football league, Everton had the highest average league attendances of any team in England. The club has recently averaged attendances of around 36,000 to 38,000 in league games at their home stadium Goodison Park, which has a capacity of 39,572, despite having the most obstructed views and poor sight lines in the Premier League. A 2006–07 fan survey by the Premier League listed 15% of Everton fans as being unhappy with sight lines at Goodison Park, and only 19% described match views as "very good". For the 2009–10 season, Everton sold over 24,000 season tickets. For the 2016–17 season, this had been upped to 31,000. In the same season, around 7,000 Evertonians travelled to Lisbon for a match against Benfica. The highest ever season average attendance at Everton was in 1963 with 51,603, the best of any club in that particular season. The following season, the club was once again the best supported side in England.

The 2004–05 Premier League survey, which asked almost 1,400 Everton fans various questions, found that 30% of those fans lived in Liverpool. The 2007–08 survey found that Everton fans on average live 44 miles away from Goodison Park, three miles less than the average and a huge difference compared with fans of rivals Liverpool and Manchester United, who were on average 82 and 78 miles from their respective stadiums. Everton draws the vast majority of its support from Merseyside, Cheshire, Southern parts of Lancashire, Western enclaves of Greater Manchester and North Wales. Everton also has a notable number of supporters in countries such as Australia, Ireland, South Africa, Thailand, and the United States.

The 2003–04 survey found that 71% of Everton fans earn under £30,000 a year, the lowest average income in the league. The 2002–03 report found Everton had the highest number of season ticket holders from the two lowest social classifications with 16%. A study in August 2012 by property website Zoopla found that houses around Goodison Park were the cheapest of any Premier League club, averaging £66,000, almost £30,000 less than the entry above it.

Social media
In 2009, Everton became the first Premier League club to have an official Facebook page. As of November 2022, the club has the following social media statistics:

Rivalries
A 2003 survey by The Football Fans Census found that Liverpool are still Everton's main rivals. The intra-city rivalry between the two is commonly referred to as “the friendly derby”, as it is common for families and households in the city to have both Everton and Liverpool fans. Whilst performances on the pitch are heated and passionate, the off-pitch behaviour of fans is largely amicable in comparison to other rivalries, and it is one of the few matches in the Premier League to not enforce total fan segregation during the matches.

Fan clubs
Everton have fan clubs located all over the world. The three largest clubs outside England are Emerald Everton Supporters Club in Ireland, ESCNI in Northern Ireland, and the Everton Supporters Club on the Isle of Man.

Notable supporters

Footballers

 John Bailey
 Eirik Bakke
 Michael Ball
 David Moyes
 Ross Barkley
 Joey Barton
 Jim Bentley
 Delial Brewster
 Nathan Broadhead
 Jamie Carragher
 Harry Charsley
 Luca Connell
 Tom Davies 
 Dixie Dean
 John Ebbrell
 Phil Edwards
 Gareth Farrelly
 Morgan Feeney
 Robbie Fowler
 Danny Fox
 Ronnie Goodlass
 Tony Grant
 Colin Harvey
 Wayne Hennessey
 Tony Hibbert
 Dave Hickson
 Andy Holden
 Lewis Holtby
 Barry Horne
 Eddie Howe
 Bryan Hughes
 Francis Jeffers
 Dave Jones
 Jonjoe Kenny
 Brian Labone
 Adam Lallana 
 Callum Lang
 Henrik Larsson
 Anders Limpar
 Mick Lyons
 Cliff Marshall
 Jay McEveley
 Steve McMahon
 Steve McManaman
 Callum McManaman
 Billy Meredith
 Derek Mountfield
 Carlo Nash
 David Nugent
 Iffy Onuora
 Michael Owen
 Billy Paynter
 Kevin Ratcliffe
 Gary Roberts
 Jack Rodwell
 Wayne Rooney
 Joe Royle
 Ian Rush
 Kevin Sheedy
 Gylfi Sigurðsson
 Neville Southall
 Gary Speed
 Alan Stubbs
 Derek Temple
 Mickey Thomas
 David Thompson
 Lee Trundle
 David Unsworth
 Roy Vernon
 Mike Walker
 Jonathan Walters
 Tony Warner
 Ian Woan
 Stephen Wright
 Eddie Youds

Actors and entertainers

 Jake Abraham, actor
 Paul Angelis, actor
 Helena Bonham Carter, actress
 Billy Butler, entertainer, radio presenter
 George Christopher, actor
 Alan Clarke, director
 Jodie Comer, actress
 Ryan Coogler, filmmaker
 Kenneth Cope, actor
 George Costigan, actor
 Matt Damon, actor
 Bill Dean, actor
 Judi Dench, actress
 Jennifer Ellison, actress
 Gareth Evans, filmmaker
 Andrew Gower, actor
 Ian Hart, actor
 Sam Hoare, actor
 Amanda Holden, television presenter
 Gordon Honeycombe, newscaster, writer
 Geoffrey Hughes, actor
 John Hurt, actor
 Rob James-Collier, actor
 Gethin Jones, television presenter
 Ken Jones, actor
 Michael B. Jordan, actor
 Andrew Lancel, actor
 Fred Lawless, playwright
 Dolph Lundgren, actor
 Roger McGough, poet
 Victor McGuire, actor
 Jimmy Mulville, comedian
 Simon O'Brien, television presenter
 Tom O'Connor, comedian
 Mike Parry, radio presenter
 Luke Roskell, actor
 Leonard Rossiter, actor
 Will Sliney, comic book artist
 Sylvester Stallone, actor
 Freddie Starr, comedian
 Ed Stewart, broadcaster
 Claire Sweeney, actress
 Bill Tidy, cartoonist, writer
 David Vitty, radio presenter
 Finty Williams, actress 
 Michael Williams, actor

Musicians

 Ian Astbury, The Cult
 Ian Ball, Gomez
 John Lennon, The Beatles 
 Justin Bieber, singer
 DCUP, record producer
 DMA's, band
 Paul Draper, Mansun
 Gang of Youths, band
 Samuel T. Herring, Future Islands
 Lee Latchford-Evans, Steps
 She Drew the Gun, band
 Mike Lewis, Lostprophets
 Keavy Lynch, B*Witched
 Lee Mavers, The La's
 Pete Best, The Beatles
 Shane MacGowan, The Pogues
 Paul McCartney, The Beatles, Wings
 Liz McClarnon, Atomic Kitten
 Damon Minchella, Ocean Colour Scene
 Paul Molloy, The Zutons
 Keith Mullin, The Farm
 Nas, rapper
 Keith O'Neill, Cast
 Sean Payne, The Zutons
 Howie Payne, musician
 Nicola Roberts, Girls Aloud
 Bill Ryder-Jones, The Coral
 Osmo Tapio Räihälä, composer
 Donny Tourette, Towers of London
 Circa Waves, band
 The Wombats, band

Politicians

 Joe Anderson, former Mayor of Liverpool
 Joe Benton, Labour MP for Bootle
 Warren Bradley, former Liberal Democrats councillor
 Andy Burnham, Mayor of Greater Manchester, former Labour MP
 Nigel Dodds, DUP MP for North Belfast constituency
 Mark H. Durkan, SDLP MP for Foyle
 Chan Chun Sing, Minister for Trade and Industry (Singapore)
 Derek Hatton, former Labour Deputy Leader of Liverpool City Council
 Eric Heffer, former Labour MP for Liverpool Walton
 Barry Jones, Baron Jones, former Labour MP for Alyn and Deeside
 Trevor Lunn, former Alliance, Independent MLA for Lagan Valley
 Chris Matheson, Labour MP for City of Chester
 Eddie McGrady, former SDLP MP for South Down
 Eugene McMenamin, former SDLP MP for West Tyrone
 Steven Norris, former Conservative MP for Oxford East
 Albert Owen, Labour MP for Ynys Môn
 Pat Wall, former Labour MP for Bradford North
 Bob Wareing, former Labour MP for Liverpool West Derby

Other sports

 Eddie Alvarez, mixed martial artist
 Jake Ball, cricketer
 Tony Bellew, boxer
Riddick Bowe, boxer
 Robbie Brookside, professional wrestler
 Ian Cockbain, cricketer
 John Conteh, boxer
 Bryan Danielson, professional wrestler
 Matt Dawson, rugby union player
 Tommy Fleetwood, golfer
 James Graham, rugby league player
 Jeff Hardy, professional wrestler
 Austin Healey, rugby union player
 Jacob Hester, American football player
 John Higgins, snooker
 Adam Jones, rugby union player
 Drake Maverick, professional wrestler
 Molly McCann, mixed martial artist
 Christopher McDermott, handball player
 John McEnroe, tennis player
 Iafeta Paleaaesina, rugby league player
 John Parrott, snooker player
 Alexei Popyrin, tennis player

Journalists
 Roger Bennett, journalist
 Tony Chambers, former Editor-in-Chief of Wallpaper magazine
 Henry McDonald, writer
 Ken Reid, UTV political editor
 Ian Ross, sports writer and Everton Director of Communications
 Brian Viner, writer
 Elton Welsby, sports presenter

Businesspeople
 Mark Carney, Former Governor of the Bank of England
 Terry Leahy, former CEO of Tesco

In popular culture

Ken Loach's 1968 docu-drama The Golden Vision concerned a group of Everton fans and was named after Alex Young, who also appears on-screen.
In Alan Bleasdale's Liverpool-based series Boys from the Blackstuff, socialist plasterer Snowy Malone tells Chrissie that his militant trade unionist father brought him up "to believe in what was good and proper." Loggo quickly quips, "I didn't know your dad supported Everton."
The Rutles, a parody of Beatlemania, sees Eric Idle interviewing respected Liverpool poet Roger McGough (a real life Evertonian). He introduces him to the camera as "he was born in Liverpool, grew up in Liverpool, drank in Liverpool, wrote about Liverpool and his football team is of course... Everton".
The 1997 television drama The Fix told the story of the exposure of a match fixing scandal in 1963 that centred around Everton player Tony Kay. Jason Isaacs (himself a Liverpool fan) played Kay while Colin Welland portrayed then manager Harry Catterick with a broad Liverpool accent, despite the fact Catterick himself was from Darlington. The drama also featured lifelong Liverpool fan Ricky Tomlinson playing Gordon, a fictitious character and Everton fanatic.
The 1979 television advertisement for ITV's ORACLE teletext service a disembodied voice in the strong Liverpool accent asks, "How Did Everton do?" To which he receives the response, when the page is searched on the teletext service, "Everton 1 Stoke 1."
In the comedy series Harry Enfield and Chums episode "The Scousers Visit That London", one of the three stereotype Scousers is an Everton fan. Starting off on the National Express coach to Wembley, he sits cross from the two Liverpool fans singing "You'll Never Walk Alone". When they finish he replies "up the toffees", which then erupts into an argument.
The 1994 episode "To Be a Somebody" of Cracker, in which Robert Carlyle plays a Liverpool fan who becomes a serial killer after the mental impact of the Hillsborough and the death of his father. With the police looking for a Liverpool supporter with a skinhead he is questioned by DS Beck but he manages to avoid arrest by claiming he has been diagnosed with cancer. He further avoids suspicion by claiming he is from St. Helens and supports Everton.
A 1972 episode of BBC Sitcom The Liver Birds, "Liverpool or Everton", which features future Everton chairman and actor Bill Kenwright playing a Liverpool supporter dating Sandra who has to endure Evertonian Beryl and her friends returning home celebrating a derby win.
1975 ITV sitcom The Wackers starring Ken Jones returning home from a stint in prison to his family described as a "mixed marriage" which is split between the maternal Catholic Evertonians and paternal Protestant Liverpudlians.
 Coronation Street villain Pat Phelan often discussed Everton in his lighter moments.
 In the 1990s sitcom Keeping up Appearances, Onslow (Geoffrey Hughes) discusses whether discovering his wife was a Liverpool supporter on their wedding night was grounds for divorce.
 2017 ITV drama Little Boy Blue focused on the murder of Rhys Jones. The series recreated the Jones family appeal for information and the minute's silence at Goodison Park.

References

External links
 Everton Football Club

Supporters
Association football supporters
English football supporters' associations